Al-Wifāq was a Moroccan Jewish nationalist organization promoting coexistence between Jews and Muslim communities in Morocco.

It was created January 1956, shortly before the end of the French protectorate, by members of Istiqlal Party and the Democratic Independence Party to foster nationalist sentiment among Moroccan Jews and to discourage them from emigrating to Israel.

Part of its program was social, in the service of Jewish-Muslim coexistence and familiarizing Muslims with Jewish culture: galas attended by Jews and Muslims, broadcasting Jewish songs nationally on Moroccan Radio and Television, adding Hebrew to the language offerings at the Arabic Department of the university in Rabat, and hosting public lectures about Jewish history and culture throughout Morocco. Part of its program was also working to prepare the country's Jewish population for "the responsibilities of citizenship in independent Morocco," especially promoting literacy in Arabic among Jews.

These efforts had only limited success. For example, La Voix des communautés (“the Voice of the Communities”), a monthly Jewish periodical, was published with an Arabic supplement, but just once. Jews wrote for some Moroccan nationalist publications in Arabic, but no Muslims were published in any Jewish publications. 

Marc Sabbah, close to the Istiqlal leader Mehdi Ben Barka, was among the Jewish leaders of al-Wifāq. Others included Joe Ohana and Albert Aflalo.

See also
 History of the Jews in Morocco
 Mellah

References and notes

Islamic and Jewish interfaith dialogue
Jewish Moroccan history
Moroccan nationalism
Organizations established in 1956
Political organizations based in Morocco
1956 establishments in Morocco
1956 disestablishments in Morocco
Organizations disestablished in 1956